The United States women's national rugby sevens team competes in international rugby sevens competitions. The team finished second at the 2015 USA Women's Sevens, after defeating Russia in the semifinals. They competed at the 2016 Summer Olympics.

History 
(Source: US Women's Rugby Foundation and USA Rugby)

In 1996 the first assembly of a National Women's 7s team was formed. Emil Signes held tryouts to pick a team to compete in the first Women's International 7s tournament to be held during the Hong Kong 7s event. The team competed under the name ‘Atlantis’, the National 7s program created by Emil, and finished their tour undefeated. Many of these players went on to compete for the USA Women's 7s Team in the Hong Kong 7s Women's Division.

Under head coach Ric Suggit, the Eagles placed third at the 2013 Women's Sevens World Cup in Russia. They defeated Spain 10–5 in their final match, with tries coming from Emilie Bydwell and Vanesha McGee.

In June 2019, the Eagles became just the fifth team to have won a World Series tournament, joining New Zealand, Australia, Canada, and England. In that same season, the Americans finished second in the overall standings, securing both their highest finish to date and automatic qualification to the 2020 Olympic Games.

Tournament History

World Rugby Sevens Series
Season by season

* – At the start of the 2016–17 season, the plate was abandoned, with the bowl replaced by the Challenge Trophy.

Summer Olympics

Rugby World Cup Sevens

2009 
Pool B
{| class="wikitable" style="text-align: center;"
|-
! style="width:200px;"|Team
!width="40"|Pld
!width="40"|W
!width="40"|D
!width="40"|L
!width="40"|PF
!width="40"|PA
!width="40"|+/-
!width="40"|Pts
|- 
|align=left| 
|3||3||0||0||93||0||+93||9
|-
|align=left| 
|3||2||0||1||50||17||+33||7
|-
|align=left| 
|3||1||0||2||31||51||−20||5
|-
|align=left| 
|3||0||0||3||10||116||−106||3
|}
Cup

Rugby X Tournament

Players

Current squad
Squad named for the 2023 World Rugby HSBC Sevens Series in Vancouver from the 3–5 March.

Previous squads

Notable players
Akalaini (Bui) Baravilala
Carmen Farmer
Jessica Javelet
Jillion Potter
Joanne Fa'avesi
Kelly Griffin
Richelle Stephens
Victoria (Vix) Folayan

Honors

Other Top Three Finishes
2005 NAWIRA Women's 7s – Champion
2008 NAWIRA Women's 7s – Champion
2015 NACRA Sevens – Champion
2015 Pan American Games – Silver

Plate Champions
 2013 Amsterdam Women's Sevens
 2014 USA Women's Sevens
 2014 Netherlands Women's Sevens
 2015 Canada Women's Sevens
 2016 USA Women's Sevens
 2018 France Women's Sevens

Bowl Champions/Challenge Trophy/Challenge Cup
 2012 Dubai Women's Sevens
 2014 São Paulo Women's Sevens
 2018 Japan Women's Sevens

See also
Women's Premier League Rugby
United States national rugby sevens team (men's)

References

External links
 
 WorldRugby profile

sevens
Women's national rugby sevens teams
Women
World Rugby Women's Sevens Series core teams